Haworthia pubescens is a perennial succulent belonging to the genus Haworthia and is part of the fynbos. The species is native to the Western Cape and is found in Worcester. The plant has an occurrence area of less than 10 km2 and there is one subpopulation that is threatened by infrastructure development for agriculture as well as by invasive plants.

References

pubescens